Arnold Hugh William Beck (7 August 1916 – 11 October 1997) was a British scientist and electrical engineer, a specialist in plasma and microwaves, Professor of Engineering in the University of Cambridge.

Early life and education 
The younger son of Major Hugh Beck and Diana L. Beck, the young Beck was educated at Gresham's School, Holt, and University College, London, where he graduated BSc Eng. His old college elected him to a Fellowship in 1979.

Career 
In 1937, after graduation, Beck became a research engineer with Henry Hughes & Sons, remaining with the firm until 1941. Then, with the Second World War in progress, he was seconded to the Admiralty Signal Establishment until 1945. From 1947 he was an engineer with Standard Telephones and Cables, ultimately as head of the Valve Research Division. In 1958 he was appointed a Lecturer in Electrical Engineering at Cambridge, where he led a group researching new ways to generate very high frequency radio waves. In 1964 he was promoted to Reader and in 1966 was elected to one of the three Professorships of Engineering established that year. He was also Head of the University's Electrical Division from 1971 to 1981, and when he retired in 1983 he was given the title of Emeritus Professor and was elected a Life Fellow of Corpus Christi, where he had been a Fellow since 1962.

Personal life 
In 1947, Beck married Monica, a daughter of Samuel K Ratcliffe, they had no children, but raised her son Nicolas Walter from her previous marriage to William Grey Walter. In 1959, he was elected a Fellow of the Institute of Electrical and Electronics Engineers.

Publications
Velocity Modulated Thermionic Tubes (1948)
Thermionic Valves (1953)
Space-charge Waves (1958)
Words and Waves (1967)
Introduction to Physical Electronics (with H. Ahmed) (1968)
Handbook of Vacuum Physics, Vol. 2, Parts 5 and 6, 1968
Statistical Mechanics, Fluctuations and Noise (1976)

See also
Sukumar Brahma
Johan H. Enslin

References

1916 births
1997 deaths
Alumni of University College London
Fellows of Corpus Christi College, Cambridge
People educated at Gresham's School
Professors of engineering (Cambridge)
British electrical engineers
Fellow Members of the IEEE
Admiralty personnel of World War II